The Westgate area of Gloucester is centred on Westgate Street, one of the four main streets of Gloucester and one of the oldest parts of the city. The population of the Westgate ward in Gloucester was 6,687 at the time of the 2011 Census.

Notable buildings

St. Nicholas' Church, a redundant Anglican church and Grade I listed building is situated at the far end of Westgate Street with Gloucester Folk Museum almost opposite. Gloucester Cathedral is not far away and the main entrance to the Cathedral precincts is via College Green from Westgate Street.

Next to St. Nicholas' Church is the Dick Whittington Tavern, known originally as St. Nicholas House, a 15th-century town house once owned by the Whittington family of the Tale of Dick Whittington and his Cat fame. The house was restored by Gloucester Civic Trust and  Gloucester Historic Buildings Ltd in the 1980s.

Just outside the western entrance to the Cathedral precincts is St. Mary de Lode Church in Archdeacon Street, reputed to be built on the site of the first Christian church in Britain and next to it, the monument to Bishop John Hooper, burnt at the stake there in 1555.

Just off Westgate street is the House of the Tailor of Gloucester, used by Beatrix Potter as the setting for the story of the same name.

The original part of Gloucester Shire Hall, opened 1816 and designed by Sir Robert Smirke, fronts Westgate Street.

On the north side of Westgate Street is the former site of the Theatre Royal where Charles Dickens, Sir Henry Irving and Ellen Terry once played. The site is now a Poundstretcher discount store.

Pubs include:
The Lower George Inn 121 Westgate Street. (Used to be The Pig Inn) 
The Fountain Inn 53 Westgate Street.
The Dick Whittington 100 Westgate Street.
The Sword Inn 43/45 Westgate Street. (Used to be called The Union) 
The Golden Fleece (closed)
Old Crown Inn 81-83 Westgate Street.
The Lamprey 56 Westgate Street.
The Theatre Vaults 152, then 30 Westgate Street. (closed)

Notable inhabitants
Jemmy Wood, the legendary Gloucester Miser ran his Gloucester Old Bank from a medieval timber building at 22 Westgate Street, that remained until the nineteenth century. The building occupied by the bank was subsequently replaced by a Victorian Gothic building and more recently by a new building. It is now occupied by a McDonald's restaurant.

Further down the street is the home of the young Charles Wheatstone, the physicist - pioneer of telecommunications and cryptography (not to mention music acoustics etc.)

Westgate Bridge

The Westgate Bridge over the River Severn was once the longest in England. It has been replaced several times over its history.

The original medieval bridge had five great arches. In 1542 Sir Thomas Bell and his wife Joan assigned property on a sale and leaseback arrangement to the City Corporation to be used after their deaths for repairing Westgate Bridge and causeway.

In 1816, the medieval bridge was replaced by a single-span bridge designed by Sir Robert Smirke, architect of the British Museum, who also designed Gloucester Shire Hall, also in Westgate Street.

Until the first Severn Crossing was opened near Chepstow in 1966, the Westgate Bridge was the most southerly crossing point on the Severn for road traffic to or from Wales.

In the 1970s two new wide-span road bridges were built, one for each direction of traffic flow.  Between these a separate foot and cycle bridge was also built. The two road bridges were replaced again in the late 1990s, opening in 2000.

There are a number of Segregated Bicycle Paths which use the central bridge connecting nearby villages via Alney Island.

Politics
Westgate forms its own electoral ward in the constituency of Gloucester but it is not a parish and so does not have a parish council.

See also
Alney Island

References

Further reading
"Excavations at Nos. 1 and 30 Westgate Street, Gloucester: The Roman Levels" by Carolyn Heighway, Et al. in Britannia, Vol. 11 (1980), pp. 73–114.

External links
Gloucester Folk Museum

 
Transport in Gloucester
Roads in Gloucestershire
Streets in Gloucester